Hastin (हस्तिन्) is a term for elephant used in Vedic texts. Other terms for elephant include Ibha (इभ) and Vārana (वारण).

The elephant in the Rigveda 
In Rig Veda 1.84.17 and 4.4.1. and probably other instances the Rig Veda seems to refer to elephants (e.g. Bryant 2001: 323), an animal that is native to South Asia. It has been speculated that some of these verses might be references to domesticated elephants. In RV 1.64.7, 8.33.8 and 10.40.4, "wild" elephants are mentioned.

Mrga Hastin 

In the Rigveda and in the Atharvaveda, the term is translated as elephant (according to Keith and Macdonell, Roth and other scholars). In the Rig Veda, Mrga Hastin (animal with a hand) occurs in RV 1.64.7 and RV 4.16.14.

Ibha 

RV 9.57.3 and RV 6.20.8 mention s, a term meaning "servant, domestics, household" according to Roth, Ludwig, Zimmer and other Indologists. Other scholars like Pischel and Karl Friedrich Geldner translate the term as elephant. According to Sayana, Mahidhara and the Nirukta, ibha is translated as elephant. Megasthenes and Nearchos also connect ibha with elephant. The term ibha is only used in the Samhitas, and especially in the Rig Veda.

Varana 

Another term that may mean elephant is "Varana" (RV 8.33.8; RV 10.40.4). According to Macdonell and Keith, "Varana" refers to elephants.

The elephant in other Hindu texts 

The Akananuru (27) and the Purananuru (389) state that elephants were raised and trained in ancient Tamilagam's northern boundary of Venkatam hills Tirupati.

Notes

References 

Bryant, Edwin (2001). The Quest for the Origins of Vedic Culture. Oxford University Press. .
Macdonell, A.A. and Keith, A.B. 1912. The Vedic Index of Names and Subjects.
Talageri, Shrikant: The Rigveda: A Historical Analysis. 2000.

See also 
Sacred cow

Sanskrit words and phrases
Elephants in Indian culture
Elephants in Hinduism